Tegel Manor is a 1977 fantasy role-playing game adventure published by Judges Guild.

Contents
Tegel Manor is an adventure involving Tegel Manor, a great manor-fortress belonging to the Rump family, whose only living member is Sir Runic the Rump, who has tried to sell the manor with no luck, and would reward anyone who could rid the manor of his corrupt, dead ancestors.

Publication history
Tegel Manor (1977) included one of the first published dungeons in a role-playing game, and was first made available to Judges Guild subscribers as Installment L: Tegel Manor, but was made available later that year for retail sale as Tegel Manor Fantasy Game Play Aid. A cumulative sales listing shows that Tegel Manor sold over 25,000 units by 1981. While the City State of the Invincible Overlord line was licensed to Mayfair Games, Mayfair gave permission to Lou Zocchi to publish The Original Tegel Manor, Revised & Expanded (1989) through his company Gamescience.

Reception
 Don Turnbull reviewed Tegel Manor for White Dwarf #3, and stated that "I have been fortunate enough to play this scenario and found it enjoyable – not wildly suspense-full or nail-bitingly exciting, but a novel change from the more familiar dungeon-setting."

Patrick Amory reviewed Tegel Manor for Different Worlds magazine and stated that "A gigantic haunted manor house, rather randomly filled with monsters and treasure. The map is nice but almost any competent GM can produce a better adventure than this. A classic example of early Judges Guild work".

Mike Kardos reviewed Tegel Manor in The Space Gamer No. 53. Kardos commented that "With a little effort, Tegel Manor makes an enjoyable addition to any D&D campaign."

References

Judges Guild fantasy role-playing game adventures
Role-playing game supplements introduced in 1977